My Israel (Yisra'el Sheli) is an Israeli right wing extra-parliamentary movement. Its website describes itself as an "internet-based movement dedicated to spreading Zionism."

About the movement
The movement was founded in early 2010 by Ayelet Shaked and Naftali Bennett, who previously worked together in Benjamin Netanyahu's office. The movement cooperates with the Yesha Council in the fields of logistics and PR. As of September 2011 the movement's Hebrew Facebook page had over 62,000 subscribers and the English page over 26,000.

In May 2011 the movement began opening branches throughout the country and as for July the branches were opened in Haifa, Natanya, Ra'anana, Tiberias, El'ad, Beersheba, Giv'at Shmuel, Rishon LeZion and Kiryat Bialik.

in September 2014, the movement was registered as a nonprofit organization run by Sarah Haetzni-Cohen

Activity
The movement deals with public relations across the internet and especially on social networks and Wikipedia, but also arranges protests and demonstrations against alleged anti-Zionist activity in society and the media.

In 2010 My Israel started an organized campaign to insert "Zionist" editing onto Wikipedia, the free internet encyclopedia, in order  to combat what it perceived as "anti-Israel entries."

On 29 July 2011 the movement expressed its support for the social justice protests but disapproved of the heads of the protest. My Israel defined the leaders as conscientious objectors and post-Zionist leftists who publicly speak against IDF soldiers. On August 3 the movements' activists participated in a demonstration near the protest encampment in Rothschild Avenue. They joined Im Tirtzu, Bnei Akiva, and other right wing activists, and called for lowering the costs of living while expressing their support for Prime Minister Netanyahu. On September 1, the movement published an online letter from 2002, which includes Daphni Leef's signature. The letter states that the signatories refuse to "serve the occupation."

References

External links
English official website

Conservatism in Israel
Zionist organizations
Organizations established in 2010
2010 establishments in Israel
Naftali Bennett